Maximilian Christian Rossmann (born 6 May 1995) is a German professional footballer who plays centre back for Kickers Offenbach.

References

External links
 

1995 births
Living people
People from Halberstadt
German footballers
Footballers from Saxony-Anhalt
Association football defenders
3. Liga players
Regionalliga players
Eredivisie players
VfL Wolfsburg II players
Alemannia Aachen players
1. FSV Mainz 05 II players
Sportfreunde Lotte players
Heracles Almelo players
FC Viktoria Köln players
Kickers Offenbach players
German expatriate footballers
German expatriate sportspeople in the Netherlands
Expatriate footballers in the Netherlands